Marin Zulim (born 26 October 1991) is a Croatian professional footballer who most recently played as a midfielder or forward for Dugopolje.

References

External links
 
Marin Zulim at Sportnet.hr 

1991 births
Living people
Footballers from Split, Croatia
Association football midfielders
Association football forwards
Croatian footballers
Croatia youth international footballers
NK Zadar players
NK Lučko players
NK Osijek players
RNK Split players
NK Istra 1961 players
NK Inter Zaprešić players
NK Dugopolje players
Croatian Football League players
First Football League (Croatia) players